David Alexander Taylor was a successful New Zealand association football player who frequently represented his country with the All Whites.

Taylor represented the All Whites between 1967 and 1981, gaining 47 A-international caps, scoring 10 goals.

After his playing career finished Taylor continued his involvement in the game and in 1990 won the New Zealand Coach of the Year award.

References

External links

Living people
New Zealand association footballers
Year of birth missing (living people)
New Zealand international footballers
Association football midfielders
1973 Oceania Cup players